Andrés Bocanegra (30 November 1900 – 27 May 1973) was a Mexican equestrian. He competed in two events at the 1932 Summer Olympics.

References

External links
 

1900 births
1973 deaths
Mexican male equestrians
Olympic equestrians of Mexico
Equestrians at the 1932 Summer Olympics
Place of birth missing